Banque Commerciale pour l’Europe du Nord (BCEN) or Banque Commerciale pour l'Europe du Nord – Eurobank (BCEN-Eurobank) was a Soviet-controlled bank in Paris, founded in 1921 by wealthy Russian emigres and supported by Leonid Krasin who, in 1925, sold their stakes to the USSR. It maintained correspondent accounts with Western banks to secure lines of credit for facilitating Soviet imports into that country in which the correspondent account is located. Also, these correspondent accounts performed foreign currency exchange for the Kremlin.

History
During the 1920s and 1930s, Soviet and numerous foreign sources referred to this bank as the Aero Bank or Airbank in Paris and not the Aero-Bank SA which was a branch of the German bank Aerobank, which was known as the Bank der Deutschen Luftfahrt AG (BDL), and established in Paris by Nazi Germany during its occupation.

The Soviet Union used the bank to manage Spain's gold reserves during the Spanish Civil War.

After the fall of the Soviet Union, many persons involved with BCEN-Eurobank became leaders in Russian economy, banking, and finance.

The 1993 established Moscow bank "Evrofinance" was a subsidiary of Eurobank.

During the 1990s, BCEN – Eurobank was involved in the looting of Russia.

In 2005, Russia's Vneshtorgbank became the major shareholder. Later, Vneshtorgbank changed its name to VTB Bank, and BCEN-EUROBANK name was changed to VTB Bank (France) SA.

Operations
The Soviet Union supplied funds through Eurobank to the French Communist Party (PCF).

The bank had its offices at 77, 79, and 81, boulevard Haussmann in Paris.

Other associated banks
VTB has the western subsidiaries of the Central Bank of Russia and, before the dissolution of the Soviet Union, the daughters of the Soviet Union's Gosbank which were the Banque commerciale pour l'Europe du Nord or BCEN-Eurobank in Paris, Moscow Narodny Bank in London, Ost-West Handelsbank in Frankfurt, Donau Bank in Vienna, and East-West United Bank in Luxembourg.

Eurobank was associated with Eurogrefi (Paris), RTD France (Paris), Evrofinance (Moscow) and others.

Key people 
 Thomas Alibegov, Director General (1982–1987)
 Yury Ponomaryov, CEO, Chairman of the Board of Directors (1988–1998)

See also
 Foreign trade of the Soviet Union

Notes

References

Defunct banks of France
Banks of the Soviet Union
France–Soviet Union relations